Mark Mexico (born 21 May 1989) is a Papua New Guinean professional rugby league footballer who last played for the Sheffield Eagles in the Kingstone Press Championship as a  forward.

Playing career

Early career
Born in Lae, Papua New Guinea, Mexico played his junior football for Lae school Boys(Bungandi secondary school), local team Kamkumung Crushers before joining Intercity team the Lae Bombers, Enga Mioks, Master Mark City Rangers, Snax Tigers and Rabaul Gurias in the Papua New Guinea National Rugby League.

In 2013, Mexico had a short stint with Redcliffe Dolphins in the Instrust Supper Cup. Afterwards, in 2014 Mexico joined the Papua New Guinea Hunters for their inaugural season in the Queensland Cup.

New South Wales Cup
In April 2014, after being strongly linked with the Manly-Warringah Sea Eagles, Mexico signed a 1-year contract with the Cronulla-Sutherland Sharks effective immediately.

Newcastle Thunder
In 2015, Mexico made the switch to Newcastle Thunder in the English League 1.

Sheffield Eagles
After playing a total of 17 games, scoring twice, the Papua New Guinean went on to sign a two-year contract with Sheffield Eagles in the league above. Mexico is very popular with the Eagles fans and is currently in the second year of the two, with more than 50 games played and 7 tries under his belt. In the 2017 Championship Shield, Mexico was ruled out of an away game in France at Toulouse XIII because of a 'passport irregularity'. In November 2017 it was announced that Mexico would not be signing a renewed contract with the Eagles for the 2018 season.

Representative career
In 2005, Mexico played for the PNGRFL Junior Kumuls, School Boys Rugby League World Cup in Moscow at under-16 level. Two years later, Mexico played for the PNGRFL Resident Kumuls against Cairns Northern Pride and then Test Match against Toa Samoa. The next year, Mexico was selected to train in the squad for the PNGRFL Kumuls, in preparation for the Rugby League World Cup in Australia.

In 2010, Mexico was selected to train with the PNGRFL Kumuls squad for the Four Nations, again in Australia. Having played a year for the Emerging Kumuls, in 2012 Mexico played for the PNGRFL  Kumuls against Fiji. He also played for the PNGRFL Prime Ministers XIII against the Australia Prime Minister's XIII. He played in this game in 2014 as well. In 2013, Mexico played for the PNGRFL Residents Kumuls against the South Sydney Rabbitohs. He also played for the PNGRFL Prime Minister's XIII against the Australia Prime Minister's XIII.

In October 2013, Mexico was selected in the Papua New Guinean squad for the 2013 Rugby League World Cup, this time in England. Mexico was noted for his hard and aggressive style of play in his three games during this World Cup, but made no contribution to the scoring in any of the games.

References

External links
Sheffield Eagles profile
2014 Papua New Guinea Hunters profile

1989 births
Living people
Lae Bombers players
Newcastle Thunder players
Papua New Guinea Hunters players
Papua New Guinea national rugby league team players
Papua New Guinean rugby league players
Papua New Guinean sportsmen
Rugby league props
Sheffield Eagles players